The 2012 Federation Tournament of Champions took place at the Times Union Center in downtown Albany on March 23, 24 and 25. Federation championships were awarded in the AA, A and B classifications. Boys and Girls in Brooklyn won the Class AA championship. Leroy Fludd of Boys and Girls was named the Class AA tournament's Most Valuable Player.

Class AA 

Participating teams, results and individual honors in Class AA were as follows:

Participating teams

Results 

Boys and Girls finished the season with a 26-6 record.

Individual honors 

The following players were awarded individual honors for their performances at the Federation Tournament:

Most Valuable Player 

 Leroy Fludd, Boys and Girls

All-Tournament Team 

 Joel Angus, Boys and Girls
 Isaiah Cousins, Mount Vernon
 Daniel Dingle, St. Raymond
 Tyliek Kimbrough, Boys and Girls
 Wesley Myers, Boys and Girls

Sportsmanship Award 

 Will Robinson, Mount Vernon

Class A 

Participating teams, results and individual honors in Class A were as follows:

Participating teams

Results 

Long Island Lutheran finished the season with a 23-6 record.

Individual honors 

The following players were awarded individual honors for their performances at the Federation Tournament:

Most Valuable Player 

 Anthony Pate, Long Island Lutheran

All-Tournament Team 

 Ryan DeNicola, Long Island Lutheran 
 Kenneth Lee, Long Island Lutheran
 Ervin Mitchell, Brooklyn Collegiate
 John Patron, Harborfields
 Brandon Williams, Iona Prep

Class B 

Participating teams, results and individual honors in Class B were as follows:

Participating teams

Results 

Collegiate finished the season with a 27-3 record. It was Collegiate's record fifth straight state title.

Individual honors 

The following players were awarded individual honors for their performances at the Federation Tournament:

Most Valuable Player 

 Ryan Frankel, Collegiate

All-Tournament Team 

 Willie Gwathmey, Collegiate
 Ben Hackett, Bishop Ludden
 Connor Huff, Collegiate
 Samson Usilo, Nazareth
 Jordan Washington, Pathways

External links 

 http://www.nysbasketballbrackets.com/

References 

High school basketball competitions in the United States
High school sports in New York (state)
Sports competitions in Albany, New York
Basketball competitions in New York (state)
High
New York
New York state high school boys basketball championships